Eleusis was a town of ancient Boeotia, on the river Triton, and near Lake Copais. Eleusis, along with the neighbouring town of Athenae, was destroyed by an inundation.

References

Populated places in ancient Boeotia
Former populated places in Greece
Lost ancient cities and towns
Destroyed cities